Jörg Waschinski (Berlin, 1966) is a German countertenor.

Selected discography
 Carlo Broschi Farinelli: The Composer Jörg Waschinski, Salzburger Hofmusik, Wolfgang Brunner. NCA

References

External links
 www.joerg-waschinski.de

1966 births
Operatic countertenors
Singers from Berlin
Living people